The Fengjiahe Formation is a geological formation in China. It dates back to the Early Jurassic, most likely to the Pliensbachian. The formation  is up to 1500 metres thick and consists of "purple-red mudstone and argillaceous siltstone interbedded with gray-green and yellow-green quartz sandstone and feldspathic quartz sandstone"

Fossil content 
Theropod tracks geographically present in Yunnan, China.

See also 
 List of dinosaur-bearing rock formations

References 

Geologic formations of China
Jurassic System of Asia
Hettangian Stage
Sandstone formations
Fluvial deposits
Lacustrine deposits
Fossiliferous stratigraphic units of Asia
Paleontology in Yunnan